Carew Reynell may refer to:

 Carew Reynell (politician) (1563–1624), English courtier, soldier and politician
 Carew Reynell (bishop) (1698–1745), Anglican bishop
 Carew Reynell (winemaker) (1883–1915), Australian winemaker